Arboleda is a town and municipality in the Nariño Department, Colombia. Its municipal seat is known as Berruecos.

Municipalities of Nariño Department

de:Arboleda